Snow Flower and the Secret Fan is a 2011 historical drama film directed by Wayne Wang, based on the novel of the same name written by Lisa See. The film stars Gianna Jun, Li Bingbing, Archie Kao, Vivian Wu, and Hugh Jackman.

Plot
In nineteenth-century China, two girls named Snow Flower (Gianna Jun) and Lily (Li Bing Bing) are forever bonded together as sworn sisters. They are paired as laotong by a matchmaker who is also responsible for arranging their marriages. They are isolated by their families and communicate by writing in a secret sisterly language, Nü shu (a historical practice in China in that period) on a unique Chinese fan that Snow Flower possesses.

Meanwhile, in the present day Shanghai, their descendants Sophia Liao and Nina Wei struggle with the intimacy of their own pure and intense childhood friendship. As teenagers, Sophia and Nina were introduced to the idea of laotong, and they signed a traditional laotong contract on the cover of Canto-pop Faye Wong's album Fu Zao (Restless in English). Faye Wong was their favorite singer and their liberated dancing to the "degenerate" sounds of the cheerful refrain "la cha bor" was one of the reasons Sophia's stepmother attempted to separate them. Eventually they are separated but come together again when Sophia falls into a coma after being struck by a taxi while cycling. Reunited at long last, they must come to understand the story of the strong and close ancestral connection hidden from them in the folds of the antique white silk fan or lose one another forever in the process.

Cast
 Gianna Jun as Sophia/Snow Flower
 Li Bingbing as Nina/Lily
 Vivian Wu as Aunt
 Hugh Jackman as Arthur
 Archie Kao as Sebastian
 Wu Jiang as Butcher
 Angela Evans as Ballroom guest
 Jennifer Lim (voice) as Snow Flower
 Christina Jun (voice) as Sophie

Production
The film was produced by IDG China Media. The filming locations were Hengdian World Studios, Heng Dian, China, and Shanghai, China with many scenes at The Peninsula Hotel on the Bund.

Distribution
Rupert Murdoch personally arranged for the film to be released by Fox Searchlight Pictures, which opened the film in North America on July 15, 2011.

Reception
The film received generally negative reviews from critics. , the film holds a 21% approval rating on Rotten Tomatoes, based on 89 reviews, with an average score of 4.52/10. On Metacritic, it has a score of 42 out of a possible 100, based on 31 reviews.

References

External links
 
 
 
 
 

2011 films
2010s historical drama films
2011 independent films
Films about Chinese Americans
Asian-American drama films
Films directed by Wayne Wang
Films scored by Rachel Portman
Films set in China
Films shot in China
Chinese historical drama films
Chinese independent films
Fox Searchlight Pictures films
American historical drama films
American independent films
Films based on American novels
2011 drama films
Films set in 19th-century Qing dynasty
Chinese-language American films
2010s English-language films
2010s American films